Nelson Mandela took the oath as President of South Africa on 10 May 1994 and announced a Government of National Unity on 11 May 1994. The cabinet included members of Mandela's African National Congress, the National Party and Inkatha Freedom Party, as it was required under the terms of the Clause 88 of the Interim Constitution of South Africa that all parties winning more than 20 seats in National Assembly be given representation in the cabinet.

Background
In the election of 27 April 1994, the African National Congress obtained the majority of seats in the National Assembly, and thus could form the government on its own. The two chief parties who made use of the provision for a GNU were the National Party and the Inkatha Freedom Party, both of which obtained cabinet portfolios for their leaders and other members of parliament. President Nelson Mandela also invited other parties to join the cabinet, even though they did not obtain the minimum twenty seats in the National Assembly.

The aims of the GNU centred on correcting social and economic injustices left by the legacy of Apartheid. The main aim, however, was that of creating a final constitution. The constitution was essentially a two-step process. During the CODESA talks – started in 1991 – the NP (National Party) and ANC (African National Congress) agreed to create an interim constitution, which would be the basis for a final constitution. The final constitution was to be drawn up by the two chambers of parliament – the Senate and National Assembly.

However, it was important to the GNU that the opinions of ordinary South Africans be included into the constitution. From 1994 to 1996 the GNU organised large media campaigns. This was not easy, considering that they needed to reach 40 million people, most of whom were illiterate or didn't have television. Slogans such as "You’ve made your mark, now have your say" were used to gain public attention for the cause. Over 1.7 million written submissions were collected over the two years. These included opinions on matters ranging from the death penalty to abortion.

On 8 May 1996 the final Constitution was adopted by the National Assembly and one day later, second Deputy President of the Republic F. W. de Klerk announced the withdrawal of his National Party from the GNU, with effect from 30 June.

The requirement for the GNU lapsed at the end of the first Parliament in 1999. Even so, the Inkatha Freedom Party continued to hold seats in the government, as minority partners, until the elections of 2004.

Cabinet
Note: Opaque background indicates the member did not serve the full term of Mandela's cabinet.

Shuffle
Cabinet changes and reshuffles:
 Minister of Finance, Derek Keys, resigned in mid-1994 and was replaced by Chris Liebenberg
 Cabinet reshuffle in March / April 1996, following resignation of Chris Liebenberg
 Cabinet reshuffle in May 1996, taking effect 1 July 1996, upon the withdrawal of the National Party (NP) from the Cabinet
 Replacement of Bantu Holomisa as Deputy Minister of Environmental Affairs and Tourism by Peter Mokaba in August 1996.

See also
 History of the Cabinet of South Africa

References

Government of South Africa
1994 establishments in South Africa
1999 disestablishments in South Africa
Cabinets established in 1994
Cabinets disestablished in 1999
Nelson Mandela